Harry Charles Prime  (March 5, 1920 – June 15, 2017) was a Big Band vocalist who performed from the late 1940s through the mid-1950s.

Prime was a featured vocalist with the orchestras of Randy Brooks, Tommy Dorsey, Jack Fina and Ralph Flanagan. He died in Chalfont, Pennsylvania in 2017 at the age of 97.

Music career
Prime recorded nearly 100 songs in the 1940s and 1950s, including "Until," a million-seller with the Tommy Dorsey Orchestra. "Until" peaked at number four in the US chart.

References

External links
 Big Band Vocalist, Harry Prime
 Harry Prime on discogs.com

1920 births
2017 deaths
American jazz singers
Big band singers
American male jazz musicians
Musicians from Philadelphia